Aereogramme were a Scottish alternative rock band from Glasgow, formed in 1998, consisting of Craig B. (vocals, guitar), Iain Cook (guitar, programming), Campbell McNeil (bass) and Martin Scott (drums). Prior to their split in 2007, the band released four studio albums.

Biography
Formed in April 1998, the band released two 7" singles in 1999 before signing to Chemikal Underground in early 2000, at which point they recorded two EPs before releasing their first full-length, A Story in White, in 2001. Sleep and Release followed in 2003 but the band moved to Undergroove Records soon after for their third official release, Seclusion. However, the group re-signed to Chemikal Underground in August 2006.

Their fourth album, My Heart Has a Wish That You Would Not Go, was released in Europe and the United States on 29 January 2007 and in Japan on 14 October 2006, taking its title from the novel The Exorcist. Vocalist Craig B. revealed the long delay between releases was partly due to losing his singing voice for six months: "We didn't know if it was going to continue so everybody went their separate ways waiting for my voice to come back. I went to see a throat doctor and he told me to eat yogurt which I did and it did absolutely nothing. The only thing that made any difference was time 'cause I'd spent the previous couple of years screaming every single night and whisky and smoking and that was just a horrible combination. I think my body just said stop".

In May 2007, Aereogramme announced online that they were to disband:

The band played their last show at the Connect Music Festival in Inverary, Scotland on 31 August 2007.

Post-Aereogramme
Iain Cook and Craig B. formed another band, The Unwinding Hours, and released an album on 15 February 2010. Craig B. has since released two solo albums under the name A Mote of Dust and an ambient album under the name Slovenly Hooks. In 2011 Cook formed Chvrches with Martin Doherty (who worked on Aereogramme's last album) and Lauren Mayberry. He previously recorded, mixed and mastered fellow Scottish indie rock band The Twilight Sad's 2008 mini-album Here, It Never Snowed. Afterwards It Did. Bassist Campbell McNeil played on that album's opening track, "And She Would Darken the Memory". Martin Scott is currently working with Scottish rock band Biffy Clyro as tour manager and Campbell McNeil is working in the same capacity with The Temper Trap and Chvrches.

Members
 Craig B. – vocals, guitar
 Iain Cook – guitar, programming
 Campbell McNeil – bass guitar
 Martin Scott – drums

Discography

Albums
A Story in White (2001)
Sleep and Release (2003)
Seclusion (2004)
My Heart Has a Wish That You Would Not Go (2007)

Singles and EPs
"Hatred" (1999)
"Translations" (1999)
"Fukd ID No. 1 – Glam Cripple EP" (2000)
"White Paw EP" (2001)
"Acoustic Tour CDR" (2003)
"Acoustic Tour CDR 2" (2003)
Livers & Lungs (2003)
"Acoustic Tour CDR 3" (2004)
"Acoustic Tour CDR 4" (2005)
In the Fishtank 14 with Isis (2006)
"Acoustic Tour CDR 5" (2006)

See also 
 List of bands from Glasgow
 List of Scottish musicians

References

External links
 Official website
 Official MySpace profile
 Undergroove Records
 Video interview and 3 live videos at wenn's rockt! WebTV

Scottish post-rock groups
Musical groups established in 1998
Musical groups disestablished in 2007
Scottish indie rock groups
1998 establishments in Scotland
Musical groups from Glasgow
Sonic Unyon artists
Matador Records artists
Chemikal Underground artists